Giulia Gatto-Monticone and Anastasia Grymalska were the defending champions, but they chose not to participate.

Kristína Kučová and Anastasija Sevastova won the title, defeating Maria Marfutina and Natalia Vikhlyantseva in the final, 6–7(1–7), 6–3, [10–5].

Seeds

Draw

External Links
 Draw

L'Open Emeraude Solaire de Saint-Malo - Doubles
L'Open 35 de Saint-Malo